Victoria Tennant (born 30 September 1950) is a British actress. She is known for her roles in the TV miniseries The Winds of War and War and Remembrance, in which she appeared as actor Robert Mitchum's on-screen love interest, Pamela Tudsbury, as well as her supporting roles in such movies as All of Me (1984),  (1985), Flowers in the Attic (1987),  (1990), and L.A. Story (1991).

Early life

Tennant was born in London, England. Her mother, Irina Baronova, was a Russian prima ballerina who appeared with the Ballet Russe de Monte Carlo; her father, Cecil Tennant, was a producer and talent agent for MCA.

Her maternal grandfather, Mikhail Baronov, was a senior officer in the Russian Navy; his wife, the former Lydia Vishniakova, was a general's daughter. Tennant has a sister, Irina, and a brother, Robert, both of whom were seriously injured in a car accident in 1967 that killed their father. Tennant's godfather was the actor Laurence Olivier.

Like her mother, Tennant trained in ballet, first at the Elmhurst Ballet School and then (for two years) at the Central School of Speech and Drama.

Career
After a number of roles in British and other European films, including The Ragman's Daughter and Inseminoid, she emigrated to the United States. She then appeared in the TV mini-series The Winds of War and War and Remembrance, and films such as The Handmaid's Tale and Best Seller. She starred in two films with Steve Martin, her future husband: All of Me and L.A. Story.

In 2014, she published a memoir about her mother titled Irina Baronova and The Ballets Russes de Monte Carlo, published by the University of Chicago Press. The book was presented at the Bel Air Country Club in Bel Air, Los Angeles.

Personal life
Tennant's first marriage was to Peppo Vanini, a nightclub owner who owned the Xenon nightclub, in 1969 (divorced, 1976). She dated Matthew Chapman, a writer and director from 1978 until 1982, but ended their relationship upon meeting actor–comedian Steve Martin. She married Martin in 1986, and they divorced in 1994. Since 1996, Tennant has been married to Kirk Justin Stambler, a lawyer for Warner Bros., with whom she has a daughter, Katya, and a son, Nikolai.

Filmography

Film
{| class="wikitable sortable"
|-
! Year
! Title
! Role
! class="unsortable" | Notes
|-
|1972
|
|Doris Randall
|
|-
|1980
|
|Dinner Party Guest
|
|-
|1981
|Inseminoid
|Barbra
|
|-
|1981
|Sphinx
|Lady Carnarvon
|
|-
|1982
|Ich bin dein Killer
|Annette Dorberg
|
|-
|1983
|Strangers Kiss
|Carol Redding / Betty
|
|-
|1984
|All of Me
|Terry Hoskins
|
|-
|1985
|
|Helden von Tiebolt / Helden Tennyson
|
|-
|1987
|Best Seller
|Roberta Gillian
|
|-
|1987
|Flowers in the Attic
|Corinne Dollanganger
|
|-
|1989
|Fool's Mate
|Alice Gordon
|
|-
|1990
|
|Aunt Lydia
|
|-
|1990
|Whispers
|Hilary
|
|-
|1991
|L.A. Story
|Sara McDowel
|
|-
|1992
|The Plague<ref>"Review: ‘The Plague (1 Sep 1992) Variety</ref>
|Alicia Rieux
|
|-
|1996
|Edie & Pen|Blonde with Dog
|
|-
|1998
|Bram Stoker's Legend of the Mummy|Mary
|
|-
|2008
||Mrs. Woodman
|
|-
|2009
|Irene in Time"Review: ‘Irene in Time (18 Jun 2009) Variety
|Eleanor Jensen
|
|-
|2010
|Dante's Inferno: An Animated Epic|Beatrice (voice)
|Video
|-
|2013
|Cold Turkey|Elizabeth Utley
|
|-
|2013
|Louder Than Words|Lydia Thorsby
|
|-
|2018
|Alex & the List|Barbara
|Filmed in 2013
|}

Television

MusicHussy'' – theme song lyrics

References

External links
 

1950 births
20th-century English actresses
21st-century English actresses
Actresses from London
Alumni of the Royal Central School of Speech and Drama
British expatriate actresses in the United States
English ballerinas
English emigrants to the United States
English film actresses
English people of Russian descent
English television actresses
Living people
People educated at the Elmhurst School for Dance